Cristina Dinu (born 18 January 1993) is a professional Romanian tennis player.

Dinu has won 23 singles and 28 doubles titles on the ITF Women's Circuit. On 30 September 2013, she reached her best singles ranking of world No. 179. On 20 May 2019, she peaked at No. 153 in the WTA doubles rankings.

In July 2015, Dinu attended Bucharest Open, and she won three consecutive qualifying rounds (def. top-seeded Yaroslava Shvedova in the last round), eventually losing on the main draw to Denisa Allertova, in a thrilling match. In 2022, Cristina Dinu joined to Sportsin Arad Club.

Junior career
She was ranked world's 11th female junior player in May 2010 and was part of the main singles and doubles draws for the last five Grand Slam tournaments: 2009 US Open, 2010 Australian Open, 2010 French Open, 2010 Wimbledon Championships, 2010 US Open and competed at the 2010 Summer Youth Olympics also.

Grand Slam performance timelines

Singles

ITF finals

Singles: 33 (23 titles, 10 runner–ups)

Doubles: 50 (28 titles, 22 runner–ups)

Notes

References

External links

 
 
 

1993 births
Living people
Tennis players from Bucharest
Romanian female tennis players
Tennis players at the 2010 Summer Youth Olympics